Anthony P. Monaco (born October 10, 1959) is an American geneticist and university administrator. He has been president of Tufts University since 2011.

Life 
Monaco was born in Wilmington, Delaware and graduated from the Salesianum School in 1977. He earned an undergraduate degree as an independent concentrator in neuroscience and behavior at Princeton University in 1981 and played goalie on their men's water polo team.

Monaco earned his Ph.D. in Neurobiology in 1987 and his M.D. in 1988 in a joint program from Harvard University. His doctoral research, supervised by Louis M. Kunkel, led to his landmark discovery of the gene responsible for X-linked Duchenne and Becker muscular dystrophy. He subsequently completed a postdoctoral fellowship in London, where he worked on the human genome project at the Imperial Cancer Research Fund (now Cancer Research UK), and subsequently a faculty position at the Institute of Molecular Medicine of the University of Oxford. Monaco identified the first gene specifically involved in human speech and language. Nobel Prize-winning biologist Paul Nurse once stated "Tony Monaco was among the first to recognize the importance of what was still an emerging research frontier, human genetics, and its vast potential to address problems such as cancer and autism."

Monaco held a series of administrative positions at Oxford, the last being Pro-Vice-Chancellor (Planning and Resources), prior to being appointed President of Tufts University. He was also the Head of the Neurodevelopmental and Neurological Disorders Group at the Wellcome Trust Centre for Human Genetics.

Monaco assumed the office of President of Tufts University in August 2011 from Lawrence Bacow.

References

External links 

 

1959 births
Living people
Pro-Vice-Chancellors of the University of Oxford
Fellows of Merton College, Oxford
Harvard University alumni
Princeton University alumni
Harvard Medical School alumni
Presidents of Tufts University
Salesianum School alumni